Toonage is the debut album from the Danish bubblegum dance group Cartoons. It was released in 1998 and was a huge success for the band. The album inside keeps the group's biggest hit "Witch Doctor", a cover version of Ross Bagdasarian's song from 1958. The number reached # 2 on the UK Singles Chart. The first single "DooDah!", adapted from American folk song "Camptown Races", was a big hit also in several countries, including Denmark, where it reached # 3 on the Danish charts.

The album was rereleased in 1999 titled More Toonage which contained more songs than the original.

Original track listing

More Toonage track listing

Charts

Weekly charts

Year-end charts

Certifications

References

External links
 
 
 

1998 debut albums
1999 albums
Cartoons (band) albums
Spanish-language albums